Zipp 2001 and 3001 were a line of bicycle frames, now discontinued, made by the Zipp company.  Though they have been out of production since 1997, they are still considered one of the fastest time trial frames ever made , and still have a cult following within triathlon, where they remain race-legal .

The mid-1990s were a fertile time for bicycle designers.  New materials (aluminum, carbon fiber) presented new design possibilities, and a number of "non-traditional" designs appeared.  While the Zipp 2001 may be one of the better known products, other frames made in this era included Hotta, Softride, Trek's Y-foil, and the Cheetah Cat.

Theory

Timeline
The frame that was to become the 2001 was first shown in prototype form in 1990, finalized in 1991, and entered production in 1992.  The Zipp 3001 (which was a 2001 with additional boron strips stiffening the carbon fiber) was offered in 1997.  In 1998, the UCI announced that all non-double diamond frames would be illegal for road racing starting in January 2000.  This led Zipp to discontinue production at the end of 1997.

The existing component inventory was sold to one of the men who had worked on frame production, and the frames have not been produced since that time.

Current status
Since January 2000, Zipps have not been legal for use in road racing or UCI organized time trials.  They are, however, legal in triathlon, which has much more liberal equipment rules.  Despite the fact that they have been out of production for 20 years, the frames still have a cult following within triathlon.  While they are known for being flexible, and therefore not well suited to hillclimbing, they are well suited to flatter courses.

Notes

External links
Original Zipp Website Cached
Zipp Timeline with Catalogs by Year

Bicycle parts
Bicycle models